"I'm Not Alone" is a song by Scottish recording artist Calvin Harris, released as the lead single from his second studio album, Ready for the Weekend (2009). The track was first played by Pete Tong on BBC Radio 1 as his "essential new tune" on 23 January 2009 and has been described as a slice of euphoric dance.

On 12 April 2009, the song debuted at number one on the UK Singles Chart, earning Harris his first solo number-one single on the chart and second overall following his 2008 collaboration with Dizzee Rascal and Chrome, "Dance wiv Me".

In 2010, Harris received a writing credit on Chris Brown's hit single "Yeah 3x", due to the perceived similarities between the two songs.

Background and writing
Harris called the song "a big stadium dance tune, somewhere between Snow Patrol, Faithless and Grandaddy". He said in a publicity release: "The whole track's a light and shade thing, two styles put together. I find it quite hard to write a happy-happy lyric now, for some reason. I don't know why that is, to be honest with you. Maybe it's staying in a room for a huge amount of time on your own, and that's reflected in the lyrics!" The song is written in the key of E minor, and follows a chord progression of Em/D/Am/C.

Chart performance
"I'm Not Alone" debuted at number one on the UK Singles Chart on 12 April 2009 ― for the week ending 18 April 2009 ― knocking Lady Gaga's "Poker Face" off the top of the chart. It remained at the top position for two weeks, until it was dethroned by Tinchy Stryder's "Number 1" featuring N-Dubz. On 3 January 2010, "I'm Not Alone" re-entered the chart at number ninety-nine.

In the Republic of Ireland, the single debuted at number fourteen on the Irish Singles Chart on 9 April 2009, peaking at number four by its third week.

Controversy
When Chris Brown's 2010 single "Yeah 3x" was released, Harris claimed that "Yeah 3x" plagiarised "I'm Not Alone". He tweeted, "Choked on my cornflakes when I heard [the] new Chris Brown single this morning. Do you know what I mean?" After receiving many abusive messages from Brown's fans after posting the comment, he later tweeted, "I don't care that you call me a nobody. Stealing is still stealing, doesn't matter who you are! ... Because Chris Brown is an international celebrity doesn't make it OK to rip off a guy from [the] UK not many people have heard of."

When asked in an interview with Australia's Herald Sun if Brown knew him, Harris replied, "Well, he's never heard of me, that's the funniest thing. But the producer he's worked with, DJ Frank E, has definitely heard of me. He's a respected producer, he's worked with Tiësto on a few tracks, perhaps that's where the link is. It's all a bit of fun." Brown later spoke with Harris and upon hearing the similarities between the two songs, had Harris' name added to the songwriting credits, with no legal action taken. The two artists reportedly have no hard feelings toward each other since the controversy; Harris even called Brown his "best mate" and said that he enjoys listening to his work.

Music video

The music video for "I'm Not Alone" was filmed in Oslo, Norway on 6 February 2009. It was directed by Christian Holm-Glad. The clip begins with a small boy (potentially meant to represent a young Harris) found in thick snow wandering the woods dragging a sledge with a toy bear on top. He then sets up camp and lights a fire to keep warm whilst cuddling his toy bear. The bear is then found on the sledge again and is then dropped. The scene closes and cuts to a dungeon styled setting that showcases Harris portrayed as a Frankenstein-type character who is seen to perform experiments on numerous female captives, combining their essences to reanimate his "lost" teddy bear.

"I'm Not Alone 2019"

Harris re-released the single on 5 April 2019, alongside the I'm Not Alone 2019 EP, featuring the re-released 2019 edit, several new remixes and a remastered version.

Track listings

UK CD single
"I'm Not Alone" (Radio Edit) – 3:32
"I'm Not Alone" (Extended Mix) – 4:28

UK 12-inch single
A1. "I'm Not Alone" (Hervé's See You at the Festival Remix) – 5:33
A2. "I'm Not Alone" (Radio Edit) – 3:32
B1. "I'm Not Alone" (Deadmau5 Remix) – 8:15
B2. "I'm Not Alone" (Extended Mix) – 4:28

UK iTunes single
"I'm Not Alone" (Tiësto Remix) – 6:41
"I'm Not Alone" (Radio Edit) – 3:32

UK iTunes EP
"I'm Not Alone" (Radio Edit) – 3:31
"I'm Not Alone" (Extended Mix) – 4:26
"I'm Not Alone" (Deadmau5 Mix) – 8:15
"I'm Not Alone" (Hervé's See You at the Festival Remix) – 5:33
"I'm Not Alone" (Burns Rework) – 6:36

US iTunes EP
"I'm Not Alone" (Radio Edit) – 3:31
"I'm Not Alone" (Extended Mix) – 4:28
"I'm Not Alone" (Tiësto Remix) – 6:41
"I'm Not Alone" (Deadmau5 Mix) – 8:15
"I'm Not Alone" (Hervé's See You at the Festival Remix) – 5:34
"I'm Not Alone" (Hervé's See You at the Dub Parade) – 3:41
"I'm Not Alone" (Burns Rework) – 6:36
"I'm Not Alone" (Instrumental) – 3:31

2019 releaseDigital download'''
"I'm Not Alone" (CamelPhat Remix I) – 4:04
"I'm Not Alone" (CamelPhat Remix II) – 6:03
"I'm Not Alone" (2019 Edit) – 3:21
"I'm Not Alone" (Thomas Schumacher Remix) – 3:41
"I'm Not Alone" (2009 Remaster) – 3:36

Personnel
 Calvin Harris – vocals, producer, instrumentation, arranger, engineering, mixing
 Brian Gardner – mastering

Charts and certifications

Weekly charts

Year-end charts

Certifications

Release history

References

2009 singles
Songs about loneliness
Calvin Harris songs
Columbia Records singles
Trance songs
UK Singles Chart number-one singles
Songs written by Calvin Harris
2008 songs